Buridda is a seafood soup or stew in Italian cuisine from Liguria in northern Italy. Some preparations may be slow-cooked, while others are cooked in a relatively short amount of time (9–10 minutes). It has also been described as a stew, or as similar in texture to a stew.

Ingredients and preparation
Buridda's primary ingredients include seafood, fish broth, tomato, onion, and garlic. Traditionally, the soup was served with gallette del marinaio (dry, round bread buns), which would be soaked in it. In contemporary times, toasted bread may be used. It may contain several types of fish, and additional seafoods may include eel, squid, clams, or mussels. Simple preparations may be cooked with only dried cod and potato.

Varieties
Buridda alla Genovese is a variation that is prepared with the same base ingredients, and may also include shrimp and octopus. It has been described as a "traditional dish from Genoa". Buridda is related to bourride, a fish soup of Provence and the "Burrida" of Sardinia, a dish made of shark meat.

See also

 Fish stew
 List of Italian soups
 List of soups
 List of stews
 Cuisine of Liguria
 List of Italian dishes

References

Italian soups
Cuisine of Liguria